AELP may refer to the following:

Organizations 

 American Economic Liberties Project, a pro-antitrust organization in the United States
 Association of Employment and Learning Providers, a trade association for vocational learning and employment providers in the United Kingdom

Businesses 

 American Energy Partners, LP, a defunct natural gas and oil company based in the United States